This is an incomplete list of all people who previously served in the Argentine Senate.

: A B C D E F G H I J K L M N O P Q R S T U V W Y Z 


A

B

C

D

E

F

G

I

J

K

L

M

O

P

R

S

T

U

V

W

X

Y

Z

See also
List of current Argentine senators